Turkey competed at the 2006 Winter Olympics in Turin, Italy.

Competitors

Alpine skiing

A 37th-place finish for Duygu Ulusoy in the Women's giant slalom was the best result for Turkey's Alpine Skiing entrants.

Cross-country skiing 

The Turkish cross-country team got its top finish in the men's team sprint event, where Muhammet Kızılarslan and Sebahattin Oglago finished 22nd.

Distance

Sprint

Figure skating 

Tuğba Karademir, who finished 22nd in the ladies' event, gained some notoriety due to being featured by American network NBC, which opened one of its most watched broadcasts with a feature on her.

Key: CD = Compulsory Dance, FD = Free Dance, FS = Free Skate, OD = Original Dance, SP = Short Program

Officials
Mehmet Ali Şahin, Minister for Sports
Togay Bayatlı, President of the National Olympic Committee of Turkey
Neşe Gündoğan, Secretary general of the National Olympic Committee of Turkey
Hüseyin Doğan, Olympic attaché
Mehmet Atalay, Team chief
Sezai Bağbaşı, Administrator
Yunus Akgül, Administrator
Özer Ayık, Administrator 
Ahmet Kalaycıoğlu, Physician
Oleksandr Averin, Trainer cross-country skiing
Atakan Araftargil, Trainer Alpine skiing
Robert Tebby, Trainer figure skating

References
 National Olympic Committee of Turkey official website

Nations at the 2006 Winter Olympics
2006 Winter Olympics
Winter Olympics